is a TV anime adaptation of the Million Arthur series by Square Enix.

Plot
The sacred sword Excalibur was created to judge a person's ability to be king of England. Those whom the sword accepts will be called "Arthur" and will obtain great power. However, there was not a single Arthur, but many. Due to this massive creation of legendary humans, the world and its history began to be distorted. Now, with the aim of restoring the history of the world to its original course, six Arthurs, a master of the sword, a fighter, a sniper, a puncher, an alchemist and a shooter, will go to England. Their mission is to defeat all those who have managed to obtain a power from the sacred sword Excalibur and who are distorting the world.

Characters

Dancho is the cheerful blonde female leader who is an erotic pervert that wields a sword.

Tekken is high-spirit and exercises for any battle using his gauntlets. 

Yamaneko is an unsociable girl and holds a rocket launcher.

Renkin is a short girl who actually carries a huge mallet. 

Kakka is rather a cute boy but a magician with a spellbook. 

Ruro appears to be a thoughtful young man with twin firearms. 

Dancho's fairy.

Tekken's fairy.

Yamaneko's fairy.

Kakka's fairy.

Renkin's fairy.

Ruro's fairy.

Production
An anime television series adaptation of the Han-Gyaku-Sei Million Arthur MMORPG by J.C.Staff aired from October 25 to December 27, 2018 on Tokyo MX and other channels. It was announced that the series will be split-cour, with the second season airing from April 4 to June 27, 2019. The series is directed by Yōhei Suzuki and written by Gō Tamai. Yoshinari Saito provides the character designs. The series' music is composed by Go Shiina and produced by Lantis. Genco is producing the series. The opening theme song is "Highlight" by Ayaka Ōhashi, and the ending theme song is "KI-te MI-te HIT PARADE!" by Himika Akaneya, Rie Takahashi, Nao Tōyama, Yū Serizawa, Suzuko Mimori, and Rina Hidaka under their character names. The second opening theme song is "Open the Worlds" by ORESAMA, and the second ending theme song is "Pearly×Party" by the voice actress unit Pearly Fairy. The anime is licensed in North America by Funimation.

The series ran for 23 episodes. An unaired episode was included in the series' sixth Blu-ray volume, which was released on October 2, 2019.

Episode list

Season 1

Season 2

References

External links
 
Official Funimation website

Anime television series based on video games
Bandai Namco franchises
Fantasy anime and manga
Funimation
J.C.Staff
Kadokawa Dwango franchises
Square Enix franchises
Tokyo MX original programming
Works based on Square Enix video games